Zebina semiplicata is a species of minute sea snail, a marine gastropod mollusk or micromollusk in the family Zebinidae.

References

semiplicata